Anđeo Lovrov Zadranin or Anđeo Lovrin (active during the fourteenth century) was a Croatian architect, born in Zadar and mostly active in Dubrovnik.

He was a member of an architect family from Zadar. He had brothers Nikola, Juraj and Petar, who were also architects or builders.

He is mentioned in documents between 1339 and 1368. From 1348 he works on the St Blaise's Church and the Franciscan Church and Monastery in Dubrovnik. After that he left for Kotor, where he had a stonemasonry workshop.

See also 
List of Croatian architects
List of people from Zadar

External links
 Biography in the Croatian Biographical Lexicon (in Croatian)
 Anđeo Lovrov among the Croatian sculptors and architects in Dalmatia (in Croatian)

Year of death unknown
Year of birth unknown
Architects from Zadar
14th-century Croatian people